Sir James Arthur Kennedy (1882–1954) was an Australian politician and sportsman. Kennedy served as a minister in the Dunstan and Hollway Victorian state governments in the 1940s. He played Australian rules football for Essendon and Carlton during the early 1900s. He was the brother of fellow footballer Ted Kennedy.

Biography
Kennedy was born 5 February 1882 to James and Emma Kennedy in Parkville, Victoria. He first attended school at Errol Street State School before receiving a scholarship to attend Parkville Grammar School. He later attended Scotch College, graduating in 1897.

In 1913 he was married to Ann Taylor Biggins at the Congregational church in Carlton. They later had two daughters.

Sporting achievements

Australian rules football
In 1901 Kennedy joined Essendon in the Victorian Football League. Making his debut in Round 13, he played three matches for the club in the 1901 VFL season.

After several seasons away from the VFL, Kennedy joined Carlton in 1905, a year after his brother Ted had arrived at the club. His first year with Carlton was his most successful in the VFL, playing 18 matches out of a possible 19 including a preliminary final appearance. He appeared in a further five matches during the 1906 and 1907 seasons.

Cricket
Kennedy played as a batsman for the Carlton Cricket Club.

He was later president of the Brighton Cricket Club and in 1945 was appointed a trustee of the Melbourne Cricket Ground.

Working life
Soon after finishing his schooling in 1897 Kennedy was employed by the British Australasian Tobacco Company. By 1903 he had moved to the Melbourne Electric Supply Company and had gained accountancy qualifications. By 1920 he was chief accountant of MESC and secretary of the company seven years later. In 1940 he had branched out into public practice, opening an office on Collins Street, Melbourne.

Public life

Brighton City Council
In 1928 Kennedy became a member of the Brighton City Council, serving as Mayor between 1932 and 1933. He retired as a councillor in 1945. While Mayor he cancelled the annual ball to buy shoes for disadvantaged children.

Victorian Parliament
Kennedy was elected to the Victorian Legislative Council for the Higinbotham Province in 1937 representing the United Australia Party.

Under Premier Albert Dunstan he served in the transport and mines portfolios between September 1943 until October 1945. He later served under Premier Tom Hollway as Minister for public works between 1947 and 1950 and as mines minister during 1948.

Church activities
Kennedy attended the Brighton Congregational Church. As an active churchgoer, Kennedy was deeply involved in various Christian causes. From 1902 he served as a Sunday school teacher at the Brighton church, later acting as church secretary. He was for a time vice-president of the Sunday Christian Observance Council. He was treasurer of the Victorian Congregational Union for over twenty years and was president of the Congregationalist Union of Australia and New Zealand in 1940 and 1941.

Honours
In January 1950 Kennedy was made a Knight Bachelor.

Death and legacy
Kennedy died on 20 November 1954 at the Brighton home of his daughter. He was buried at the Melbourne General Cemetery. A commemorative window was dedicated to him at the Brighton Congregational Church in 1957.

References

External links
 

1882 births
1954 deaths
Carlton Football Club players
Essendon Football Club players
Australian rules footballers from Melbourne
Australian sportsperson-politicians
Members of the Victorian Legislative Council
Mayors of places in Victoria (Australia)
Australian Congregationalists
Australian Knights Bachelor
Victoria (Australia) local councillors
Liberal Party of Australia members of the Parliament of Victoria
20th-century Australian politicians
Burials at Melbourne General Cemetery
People from Parkville, Victoria
Politicians from Melbourne
People educated at Scotch College, Melbourne
Australian accountants
Australian people of English descent
Australian people of Scottish descent